The Granada Theater is a historic theater and concert venue located in Lawrence, Kansas.

History
The Granada Theater was originally built in 1928 as a vaudeville theater in Lawrence, Kansas by the Boller Brothers. It was renovated in 1934 as a movie theater. The first film shown there was Robert Montgomery's 1934 comedy Hide-Out.

The theater was renovated again in 1993 and repurposed as a comedy club/concert venue, drawing acts such as Nightwish, The Smashing Pumpkins, Ben Folds, The Flaming Lips, The Strokes, and Weezer. 

In 2005, Kansas City band The Get Up Kids recorded their live album Live! @ The Granada Theater at the Granada.

External links
 Official Website
 Venue Review at Clubplanet.com
 A brief history of the theater's early years

References

Music venues in Kansas
Theatres in Kansas
Buildings and structures in Lawrence, Kansas
1928 establishments in Kansas
Tourist attractions in Lawrence, Kansas